Timothy Smith  (born 20 February 1991) is a former Australian rules footballer playing for the Melbourne Football Club in the Australian Football League (AFL).

Pre-AFL career
At the end of the 2015 season, experienced Casey players, Evan Panozza, Mitch Gent and Will Petropoulos left the club, and Smith consequently became the oldest player on the list at twenty-five years of age and the most experienced with fifty-two games. He was named the vice-captain for the 2016 season, and after playing as the key forward for a majority of his career at Casey, he played the 2016 season as a smaller forward due to -listed players Chris Dawes, Liam Hulett and Sam Weideman featuring as the key forwards for the season. His new role saw him kick a career best thirty-one goals for the year and as a result, he became Casey's leading goalkicker and finished sixth overall in the league. 

After playing nineteen matches for the year, he helped the club secure the minor premiership and his performance in the preliminary final—which garnered a game-high three goals—saw the club qualify for the grand final for the first time since 1999. His performances during the year led to state honours when he represented Victoria against South Australia and he was named as the centre half-forward in the VFL team of the year. At the conclusion of the season, he was considered a "roughie" to be recruited in the upcoming AFL draft by Cranbourne Leader journalist, Paul Amy, due to his breakout season in the VFL.

AFL career
After his emergence for the Casey Scorpions in the VFL, Smith was recruited by the Melbourne Football Club (Casey's affiliate team) with their second selection and twenty-fifth overall in the 2017 rookie draft. He was predicted by AFL Media reporter, Dinny Navaratnam, as the draftee who would have the greatest impact at Melbourne for the 2017 season. After "impressing" in VFL pre-season matches, in which Casey-coach, Justin Plapp, said he was playing at an "exceptional level", he made his AFL debut in the twenty-nine point loss against  at Etihad Stadium in round three, in which he kicked his first AFL goal. Smith retired at the conclusion of the 2019 season.

Statistics
 Statistics are correct to the end of the 2019 season

|- style="background-color: #EAEAEA"
! scope="row" style="text-align:center" | 2017
|
| 38 || 2 || 1 || 2 || 7 || 3 || 10 || 3 || 6 || 0.5 || 1.0 || 3.5 || 1.5 || 5.0 || 1.5 || 3.0
|-
! scope="row" style="text-align:center" | 2018
|
| 38 || 4 || 3 || 3 || 21 || 30 || 51 || 14 || 24 || 0.8 || 0.8 || 5.3 || 7.5 || 12.8 || 3.5 || 6.0
|- style="background-color: #EAEAEA"
! scope="row" style="text-align:center" | 2019
|
| 38 || 7 || 7 || 6 || 42 || 32 || 74 || 24 || 19 || 1.0 || 0.9 || 6.0 || 4.6 || 10.6 || 3.4 || 2.7
|- class="sortbottom"
! colspan=3| Career
! 13
! 11
! 11
! 70
! 65
! 135
! 41
! 49
! 0.8
! 0.8
! 5.4
! 5.0
! 10.4
! 3.2
! 3.8
|}

References

External links

1991 births
Living people
Melbourne Football Club players
Casey Demons players
Australian rules footballers from Victoria (Australia)